The Josephine White Block is an historic mixed-use commercial and residential building at 737-739 Cranston Street in the Elmwood section of southern Providence, Rhode Island, United States.  It is a three-story structure with a stamped-metal facade, and sidewalls of brick (first floor) and clapboard (upper floors).  It was built c. 1894 for Josephine White, a widow who lived nearby, and houses two storefronts in the first level and four living units above.  The metal facade is the only known local installation of the St. Louis, Missouri-based Mesker Brothers, a nationally known manufacturer of metal architectural elements.

The building was listed on the National Register of Historic Places in 1980.

See also
National Register of Historic Places listings in Providence, Rhode Island

References

Commercial buildings completed in 1894
Commercial buildings on the National Register of Historic Places in Rhode Island
Buildings and structures in Providence, Rhode Island
National Register of Historic Places in Providence, Rhode Island
1894 establishments in Rhode Island